Francis George Gadd (1890 – 25 September 1957) was an English professional golfer. He was on the 1927 Ryder Cup team but did not play in any matches.

Gadd was Welsh Professional Champion in 1913, won the 1922 News of the World Match Play, won the Northern Professional Championship in 1924 and 1926 and tied for the Surrey Open Championship in 1926. He was also runner-up in the News of the World Match Play in 1924 and 1925.

Gadd died at his bungalow at the Roehampton Club on 25 September 1957. He had become depressed by his failing health and had died in a gas-filled room. The coroner returned a verdict "that he died from self-administered carbon monoxide poisoning". He was professional at the Roehampton Club from 1914 except for a period when he was at Malden Golf Club, New Malden from 1937 to 1945. He had resigned as professional at Roehampton in 1956.

Gadd was the eldest of a number of golfing brothers, including Bert who won the French and Irish Open Championships.

Professional wins
this list may be incomplete
1913 Welsh Professional Championship
1922 News of the World Match Play
1924 Daily Dispatch Northern Professional Championship
1926 Daily Dispatch Northern Professional Championship, Surrey Open Championship (tie)

Results in major championships

Note: Gadd only played in The Open Championship and the U.S. Open.

NT = No tournament
WD = withdrew
DQ = disqualified
CUT = missed the half-way cut
"T" indicates a tie for a place

Team appearances
Great Britain vs USA (representing Great Britain): 1926 (winners)
Ryder Cup (representing Great Britain): 1927

References

English male golfers
Ryder Cup competitors for Europe
People from Malvern, Worcestershire
People from Roehampton
Sportspeople from Worcestershire
Sportspeople from London
1890 births
1957 deaths